Bichon is the second album of Julien Doré, released by Columbia/Sony BMG on 21 March 2011. The release consists of a single 13-track CD and is the follow-up of his debut album Ersatz. .

Track list
"Baie des anges" (4:56)
"Kiss Me Forever" (3:01)
"BB Baleine" (duet with Françoise Hardy) (3:41)
"L'été summer" (2:44)
"Golf Bonjovi" (3:27)
"Laisse avril" (3:47)
"Roubaix mon amour" (2:58)
"Glenn Close" (7:24)
"Vitriol" (4:22)
"Miami" (2:39)
"Bleu Canard" (1:24)
"Homosexuel" (duet with Yvette Horner) (2:48)
"Bergman" (duet with Biyouna) (3:39)

Special edition
There was also a 2 CD limited edition of Bichon that contained the track list of an English  language EP in collaboration with The Bash and two additional bonus tracks as follows:

CD 1:
The exact content of above track list

CD 2:

Julien Doré & The Bash EP
(All 5 tracks in English language and credited to Julien Doré & The Bash)
"Winnipeg" (5:06)
"The Wall (3:20)
"Just A Deal" (2:41)
"Wheelchair" (2:21)
"Brown Ears" (7:11)

Bonus tracks
"L'été summer" (Demo version) (3:12)
"Wrong" (duet with Biyouna) (4:24)

Charts

References

2011 albums
Julien Doré albums